Planar Cell Polarity (PCP) is the protein mediated signaling that coordinates the orientation of cells in a layer of epithelial tissue. In vertebrates, examples of mature PCP oriented tissue are the stereo-cilia bundles in the inner ear, motile cilia of the epithelium, and cell motility in epidermal wound healing. Additionally, PCP is known to be crucial to major developmental time points including coordinating convergent extension during gastrulation and coordinating cell behavior for neural tube closure. Cells orient themselves and their neighbors by establishing asymmetric expression of PCP components on opposing cell members within cells to establish and maintain the directionality of the cells. Some of these PCP components are transmembrane proteins which can proliferate the orientation signal to the surrounding cells.

History of Planar Cell Polarity (PCP) Research 
Planar cell polarity was first described in insects and then further defined in fruit flies (Drosophila melanogaster). Some of the earlier work on gene controlled polarity of fly wings was published by D. Gubb and A. García-Bellido in 1982 describing how the mutation of some genes resulted in a morphology change in the cuticle orientation on the fly body.  The history of the PCP pathway as it was expanded by fly genetics work, which lead to the interesting names for PCP components like Frizzled, Van-gogh, and Dishevelled. These are typical nomenclature for new genes discovered in flies, which are often based on the description of the visual presentation of the mutant flies for each gene. Early PCP research focused on its role in embryology and genetics, but the discovery that PCP proteins were localized asymmetrically within the cell pushed the topic into the world of cell biology.

There was a surge in interest in the Planar Cell Polarity pathway after conserved PCP genes were found to be involved in important vertebrate processes vertebrate gastrulation, mammalian ear patterning and hearing, and neural tube closure. Discoveries from this popular wave of PCP research has found its involvement in polarized ciliary beating in the trachea and brain ventricles, oriented cell divisions, lung branching, and hair follicle alignment.

A major challenge to studying PCP is that the in vivo protein and cell contact signaling required to facilitate it are difficult to recapitulate in a cell culture dish. However, the recent advances in imaging technology and the expansion of genetic tools are helping to uncover how PCP works in the living cell and the role it plays in cell development and biology.

Core Planar Cell Polarity Components 

Core PCP genes all characterized in Drosophila mutants affect many structures in Drosophila with PCP features including the hair and bristles across the fly body. The core PCP genes in Drosophila and other vertebrates are Frizzled (Fz), Flamingo (Fmi), Strabismus (Stbm)/Van-gogh (Vang), Prickle (Pk), Dishevelled (Dsh), Diego (Dgo), and trimeric G protein Gαo.

Frizzled (Fz) -The first frizzled mutant in Drosophila was identified in 1982 by D. Gubb and A. Garcia-Bellido. The mutant had polarity defects in the wing, notum, haltere, legs, abdominal tergites and abdominal sternites. Specifically, D. Gubb and A. Garcia-Bellido saw a polarity defect in the cuticular hairs and bristles on the wings. Later research found that the function of the Frizzled (Fz) gene in Drosophila melanogaster is required to coordinate the cytoskeletons of epidermal cells to orient cuticular hairs and bristles on the surface of the insect. “In Fz mutants it is not the structure of individual hairs and bristles that is altered, but their orientation with respect to their neighbors and the organism as a whole.” As shown in Figure 2, in wild-type wing all hairs point towards the distal tip, but in Fz mutants the hairs point in a disordered manner. Frizzled encodes a seven-pass transmembrane protein and because of this it gives epithelial cells the ability to transmit and interpret polarity information from neighboring epithelial cells.

Flamingo (Fmi) – Another seven-pass transmembrane receptor, Flamingo is also a cadherin that localizes at cell-cell boundaries in the epithelia cells of Drosophila wing. In the absence of Fmi, planar polarity was distorted. Fmi localization at the proximal/distal cell boundary is first dependent on the localization of Frizzled at the same boundaries.

Canonical Vs. Non-Canonical Wnt Pathways and PCP 
The PCP signaling pathway includes several components (Fz, Dsh and Gαo) of the ‘‘canonical’’ Wnt signaling pathway. However the core PCP proteins can function independent of β-catenin to result in downstream changes to cellular cytoskeleton and are known as a ‘‘noncanonical’’ Wnt pathway.

Cross Protein Interactions to Establishing PCP Asymmetry 
The hallmark of the PCP system is the asymmetric and polarized membrane expression of PCP proteins. Dishevelled and Diego are cytoplasmic proteins and are recruited to the membrane by each other and by their association to the transmembrane PCP protein Frizzledl. Strabismus/Vang is a four-transmembrane protein and can recruit cytoplasmic PCP protein Prickle. It is known that Prickle can interact with Disheveled and perturb its recruitment by Frizzled. Through a feedback loop of the extracellular domains of Frizzled and Strabismus at the junctions of two neighboring cell membranes, the complex of Strabismus and Prickle and the complex of Frizzled and Disheveled and Diego are localized to opposite sides of the cells along the polarization axis. Flamingo is thought to localize to both sides and plays a role in homophilic adhesion, the adhesion of cells by the interaction of similar cadherin types. Failure of these PCP proteins to segregate correctly within a cell boundary can lead to a disruption in PCP such as with the hair cells on fly wings and mouse skin.

References

See also 
Cell polarity

Frizzled

Prickle (protein)

Cell biology